The 2017–2021 Iranian protests sparked by the 2016 Cyrus the Great revolt led to a series of political movements civil disobedience, online activism, and demonstrations followed by government crackdowns that since the mid-2010s have erupted nationwide in Iran, increasingly calling for regime change and overthrow of the Shiite political Islam and theocracy of the Islamic Republic of Iran, which began in 1979 following the Iranian Revolution.

The protests, which have occurred at various stages and times since the mid-2010s, increasing in both support and number each time, have found popular support amongst many Iranians. They have the intention of removing the Iranian government and addressing both economic and social issues within Iran, and are often fueled by low wages, unemployment, inflation, government corruption, an ongoing water crisis, disillusion amongst Iranian youth and by their Burnt Generation parents with the government's Islamist, anti-Western outlook, the isolation of Iran internationally, Iranian nationalist fervor and the government's handling of the COVID-19 pandemic.

The protests have been credited with being the largest challenge to the Islamic regime since the Iranian Revolution in 1978–1979, being characterised by a wider geographical spread, more diverse class and societal composition, a much more explicit defiance in its challenge of state authority, and a reduced aversion to enduring violence by dissenters, in a manner that previous Iranian protests such as those in 1999 and 2009 did not display.

This period of time coincided with a marked escalation in the Iran-Israel proxy conflict, and a "maximum pressure" campaign of sanctions imposed on the regime by the United States as punishment for its nuclear programs in violation of the JCPOA, and for its financing of terrorist proxies such as Hezbollah, Hamas, and the Houthis.

By July 2021, the next wave of protests started with the 2021–2022 Iranian protests.

Background
The sequence of protests, which included the 2016 Cyrus the Great Revolt, 2017–2018 Iranian protests, 2018–2019 Iranian general strikes and protests, Ukraine International Airlines Flight 752 protests (in January 2020), 2019–2020 Iranian protests, 2021 Iranian protests, was met with violent responses by the Iranian authorities, including the killing of 1,500 protesters in November 2019 uprising and the violent crackdown on protests in Mahshahr. Besides toppling the regime, the protest movement is aimed at poverty, issues and corruption in the economy, especially higher wages and pensions.

Protest movement

January 2020 protests and the beginning of renewed protests and unrest 

The January 2020 protests were organised by bus drivers and taxi drivers in Tehran. Anti-regime protests were rising, with this chant, "Death to corrupt officials", heard the most. Seasonal workers in Marivan participated in a strike movement as well, despite attacks by the security forces and intimidation meant to quell public protests that had begun on 24 January triggered by economic grievances. Kangan and Sanandaj experienced protests by oil workers and other sectors, with more that five blockades in protest for having not received any wages. Kaki saw protest rallies over water and fuel shortage crises sparking anger by their citizens for days. Employees in Mahshahr's petrochemical factory protested non-payment of wages and inadequate responses to their demands. Eslamabad Gharb saw Railway workers protesting against not being paid for five months and the halting of their main construction project by the Security Forces. Hundreds of customers were regularly protesting in regular marches against the stock market and central bank crash in Tehran. Buildings in Isfahan were surrounded by hundreds of farmers, repeatedly rallying over poor conditions. Recent protests also took place in Khuzestan and Ahvaz and met with violent reactions from security forces. Locals staged rallies in Ahvaz and Gorgan, protesting imprisonments of protesters and demanding the president Hassan Rouhani to step down. In Khuzestan, bus drivers went on strike in protest to their low wages and the high price of spare parts for their buses.

February 2020 
In late-January and February, retirees and workers, employees and farmers, industrial workers and miners participated in protest rallies and marches, strikes, demonstrations, unrest, protest movement and general strike campaigns across Bandar-e-Lengeh in protest against long-delayed wages and insurances. Thousands of dock workers and municipality workers held various protests, protesting for higher salaries and longer insurances. Municipality workers in Alvand, who had not received their salaries for a long time, staged protest gatherings for weeks in January and February. In Khuzestan, contract workers protested unstable conditions and low salaries, while petrochemical workers of Apadana held gatherings, speeches, meetings and boycotts in companies. Factory workers in Hamedan protested non-implementation of early retirement. Retired workers in Shiraz and service workers rallied in Mashhad in protest against low wages and fake promises. Ahvaz and Golgan saw people gathering on the streets and creating roadblocks with tires, and blockades for weeks, demonstrating against low wages and fake promises.

March 2020 
In March 2020, amid the COVID-19 outbreak, Iran's prisons became overcrowded and rioting broke out in prisons in Tehran, Khorramshahr and Ahvaz, where 17 were wounded during protests by prisoners in the city against the fears of the spread of COVID-19 in Iranian prisons. Security forces reportedly fired gunshots in Khorramshahr and altogether, 36 were feared dead during the prison riots nationwide.

April 2020 
From 9–22 April, hunger strikes, demonstrations, protest marches, public unrest and protests erupted in Iran's prisons until July as well, protesting the outbreak of COVID-19 in prison. In response, the government released 85,000 prisoners. The rioting in Fars, Khorramshahr and Ahvaz on 30–31 March was called for the release of prisoners and better conditions in prisons to combat the virus; it was the deadliest prison unrest in years.

Mid 2020 (May–August) 
A wave of massive worker protests broke out across Iran when municipal workers and nurses participated in large gatherings against the COVID-19 impact on Iran. For weeks, gatherings, meetings, speeches, strikes and demonstrations occurred nationwide, with at least two cities experiencing major protests. In Khuzestan, medical staff organised large protest rallies in front of their offices, demanding wages and better conditions for hospitality workers. Factory workers, coal miners, machine manufacturers and worker sectors have been among those protesting due to unpaid wages, shortages and poor economy. Protesters have rallied since then.

Factory and city employees, coal miners, as well as health-care workers are among those who have been protesting in Iran in July. Three weeks of worker protests have broken out across Iran as protests against working conditions, a worsening economy and issues with employment. Demonstrations and strikes were calling for payments and complaints of not receiving their wages for months, lack of jobs and employment, unemployment, poor policies and wage increases as well in cities like Tabriz, Dezful, Khoramabad, Khorramshahr (Between 13 and 26 August, workers staged strikes), Behbahan, Ghazvin, Shiraz (where sugarcane workers launched strikes) and Ahvaz by teachers, workers, miners, nurses and doctors protesting shortages and grappling with the COVID-19 outbreak, municipality workers and jobless workers who had retired. Mashhad, Rasht, Urmia, Ahvaz, Shush, Yazd, and Khomein experienced women's protests by nurses, teachers, doctors, municipality workers and taxi drivers protesting the conditions and no rights they face.

Ebrahim Arabzadeh, a contract worker at Mahshahr petrochemical complex, died from heat exhaustion at work on 28 July. This sparked an unprecedented wave of strike action across Iran, with 10,000 workers going on strike, battling the 50-degrees heat in some areas to protest in the oil and gas fields in southern Iran like Abadan and Mahshahr. Protesters were builders, electricians, welders, pipefitters and other tradesmen who are leading mass protests and political strike action across the country to protest in their tens of thousands against gang-money robbery in banks and employee conditions in Arak, where hundreds blocked and abandoned their work to join the protests and it even spread to Isfahan, where hundreds called for full-time work and permanent jobs. Workers have been on strike for days in late-July and early August, and unemployment protests have also broken out across industries and factory workers have joined the strike action, ending after a couple of weeks of strikes, with no demands met.

It is said that 237 protest movements were formed in 85 cities in Iran in July 2020. On 16 July 2020, amid a heavy security presence, protesters took to the streets of Behbehan and chanted "We don't want a clerical regime" and "Not Gaza, not Lebanon, my life only for Iran". The security forces fired tear gas to disperse the protesters. A heavy security presence was also reported in various other Iranian cities. The protests come under the slogan "#StopExecutionsInIran". On the eve of 16 July 2020, a protest gathering was formed in the city of Behbahan in Khuzestan Province. According to social media account, the execution verdicts for the protesters of 2019–2020 Iranian protests and economical hardships brought by government's lack of proper management were the key points of this protest. According to NetBlocks, Khuzestan's bandwidth was strictly limited in the night of 15 July 2020. According to Deutsche Welle, the unrest also spread to Shiraz, Isfahan, Rasht, Mashhad, Tabriz and Urmia. The protest gatherings, protesters was rallying against hardships for days before the initial uprising, with many injured during rallies as well.

The Haft Tappeh Sugar Cane Mill Labor Syndicate was the epicentre and scene of protest rallies for two months in 2020, from May to July. Workers staged daily street protests for not receiving their wages for consecutive months and the policy of privatisation. Strikers were attacked during the protests in Ahvaz, yet this wave of employee protests was the most peaceful. Thousands participated in clapping strikes, general strikes, walk-outs, chanting and rallying. Strikers were fired in response to the large strikes for months against low wages and no pay-checks. Maryam Rajavi supported the protest action, mentioning on Twitter, "The clerical regime has abandoned our people in the clutches of disease, unemployment and poverty. They do not pay workers and nurses' salaries. The only solution is replacing the mullahs' oppressive rule in #Iran with people's sovereignty and the rule of democracy". Thousands of these workers of Haft Tappeh demonstrated in the streets of Shush, calling on their colleagues to show solidarity with their protest march and the slogan "Worker of Haft Tappeh, Unity, Unity." The workers also chanted, "Death to Rouhani, reduce embezzlement, our problem will be solved," and the workers occupied the streets of Shush while shouting and clapping loudly.

Protesters rallied in Bandar Abbas, Gilan, Bushehr and other provinces for strike actions for weeks in June–July against low wages and unpaid salaries. Nurses, physicians, medical students, medical staff, doctors and appointees held rallies across Iran, mainly Mashhad and Rasht. Labour protests and union rallies were organised by professionals in Mashhad, protesting risking their lives on the frontlines and not getting their main attention. Protesters were attacked almost daily by Riot police with batons. Maryam Rajavi commented in support of the demonstrating nurses.

September 2020 
The protest movement first began on 21 September, when rallies were organized by Trade unions against low wages, but the demand became soon into a broader movement, with teachers, farmers, students, drivers, mechanics, shopkeepers, public sector workers, and more social sectors joining the movement, demanding an end to corruption, unemployment, no insurances of workers, licenses being taken away, landlord and worker's bosses taking away money form workers, shops looted and shopkeepers unemployed during the 2019-20 Iranian protests, harsh working and living conditions, blackouts, crackdowns, outages, poverty, inflation, closures of factories, government's handling of the COVID-19 pandemic, media agencies shutdowns and many more deep issues. Massive labour protests also hit areas nationwide like: Rasht, Zanjan, Yazd, Abadan, Behbahan, Shiraz, Tabriz, Isfahan, Ahvaz, Khorramshahr, Kerman, Mashhad, Ardebil and Qom.

Peaceful protests and nonviolent boycotts have also been taking place as well. Workers, teachers and students have also led massive labour protests and general strikes, occupations, wildcat strikes, Rent strikes at shops and closed companies and sit-ins. On 29 September, police, who had hitherto been passive, moved in to disperse protesters but failed to quell the protests. On 24 January, after three days of protests in Iranshahr, Security forces fired birdshot and stun grenades to quell youth protests and insurrectional demonstrations and rebellious protests in the city.

On 21–29 September, workers in sugar factories in Mahabad took to the streets in protest against non-payments, dismissal of several of their colleagues and worker conditions. The protest in Isfahan by locals, protesting heavy machinery in their farms, was quelled. Hundreds of workers in Ahvaz demanded authorities to provide job and livelihood security. In Babol, nurses and medical staff protested against delayed paychecks. In Tehran, retired workers led rallies asking for their wages claims to be addressed. In factories and companies in Yazd, workers gathered in large numbers, protesting the officials' refusal to pay their overdue wages. In Savadkuh, industrial workers and miners in factories participated in protests calling for adequate pay based on their job conditions. In Shush, farmers protested a sugar beet contract with Kermanshah, Islamabad companies. In Shiraz, nurses and medical staff protested their delayed paychecks for days. Truck drivers in the city of Fardis protested low fares and high vehicle maintenance costs in a large strike.

OctoberNovember 2020 
Between 30 September and 7 October, there were protests in Zanjan, Tabriz, Khuzestan and Urmia, demonstrating against the prices of bread and poor conditions. Medical staff went on strike and kindergarten teachers rallied against the government. Teachers and female workers protested in Tehran, Dezful and Hamedan for unconditional employment and better working statuses. Workers rallied in Yazd and Fars protesting the conditions there.

Workers at natural-gas and petrochemical factories in Hamideh and Mahshahr went on strike for weeks in protest against arrests of workers, employee discrimination and delayed pay checks.

In October 2020, protesters rallied in support of Azerbaijan in the conflict with Armenia, the 2020 Nagorno-Karabakh War. The military crackdown became harsh as protests became larger and violent. Ethnic Azeris constitute a large minority of the Iranian population. The military forces used tear gas and reportedly clashed with protesters in Tabriz, Ardebil, Tehran and Urmia, calling for the closure of the border with Armenia. 38 were detained during demonstrations.

Worker protests and rallies from 1–21 October were launched after payments were delayed and unpaid wages triggered protests. In Fars, workers protested in large numbers, protesting delayed pay-checks and poor livelihoods. Municipality workers in Hamideh, Ahvaz were arrested after holding gatherings against delayed pay-checks. After Mohammad Reza Shajarian's death, massive and large anti-regime protests broke out in Tehran, as thousands called for press freedom and the government of Hassan Rouhani to step down. The protest movement led to many arrests and interventions as well. In Bojnurd, municipal workers gathered with their families to protest lack of job security. In Ahvaz, fired municipality workers demanded to be returned to work. Arvand Kenar, Ahvaz saw mass protests by municipal workers, private sector workers, miners in Kerman and locals there protested against the drying up of their main wells, pre-school teachers held rallies in Ahvaz demanding a change in their employment status and healthcare workers in protest against delayed wages. In Tabriz, workers rallied in front of their factory, protesting their colleagues dismissals and delayed pay-checks. In Meshginshahr, protesters took to the streets in factories to protest delayed pay-checks.

Mass protests by 25000 workers and railway workers, miners, infrastructure sectors and teachers occurred all across Iran in October–November, the biggest workers protests since the 1953 strikes. Oil-workers and gas-sector strikes were organised in protest against unpaid wages for months. Spontaneous and sporadic protests simultaneously broke out across the country. Ongoing strikes occurred by workers in Tabriz, Khorasan, Markazi, Khuzestan and more in protest by workers, municipalities, teachers, railway employees and others.

Late 2020 and early 2021 
A nonviolent three-day strike campaign was launched by toll workers in Ghazvin against employment statuses, meaning high unemployment. Between 19 January and 23 February, nationwide retiree protests erupted in protest against low wages for retirees, demanding justice over the deaths of 1500 during the 2019-2020 Iranian protests and an end to poverty. Iran's Stock Market Exchange bubble growth finally burst on 24 January. As a result, many people lost the life savings they had invested in the stock market, so there were large protests in Tehran where police fired on protesters. On 7 February, the Iranian media warned of another uprising after major protests in February. Newspaper Jahane-e-Sarat has noted that injustice and inflation had grappled Iranian society, fearing another uprising in our country.

Between December–January, thousands of stock owners and stock marketers have taken to the streets in protest against the stock crash in Iran. Kohgiluyeh saw protests in January, demonstrating against water crisis and polluted water, calling for the government to take action over the crisis. These deprived workers spread their empty tablecloths on the street. Contract workers in Ilam and Tehran led large rallies over uncertainty of their employment status (around 13,000 went on strike). The employees and retirees taking to the streets in December held rallies over the crisis in the country, mainly in Ahvaz, where major gatherings have been held since November, protesting nonpayments and low wages. Thousands of ranchers, livestock workers and university students held rallies over unequal society, calling for president Hassan Rouhani to listen to their demands. Hundreds of school teachers, nurses and contact health workers held marches in Tehran over unequal job status and employment issues, with demands for authorities to clarify their employment status. Drivers of fuel tankers led ten days of labour protests in November–December, to protest low fares and demand higher fares in Arak and Kermanshah. Workers in Ahvaz and restaurant workers and shop owners protested humidity and conditions during work period, inspiring thousands of other worker groups across the country to protest in strike action, starting on 26 November and ending on 1 December. Poultry farmers and municipality workers led protests as well as retired workers in Khuzestan. Hundreds of academic staff and faculty members in Mahshahr took to the streets to embrace the same demands of the protesters in other cities. Protests by bus drivers, truckers unions, landowners, sugarcane workers, cargo workers, farmers took to the streets in Shush (over the lack of job security and privatisation of sugarcane worker factories), Isfahan (where farmers protested irrigation water rights), protesting their harsh living conditions and more depriving issues these groups are facing.

Thousands of retirees staged rallies in multiple cities, including Tehran, Mashhad, Hamadan, Khorramabad, Karaj, Shush, Rasht, Shiraz, Qazvin, and Kermanshah on 10 January to express their frustrating dissatisfaction with low access to their rights and demanding their basic rights.

The current and recent wave of retiree protests began on 13 December when hundreds of protests and retirees launched nationwide general strikes and countrywide popular demonstrations against inflation and unemployment while economic turmoil and hardships adjusting to pensions also triggered the controversy, ongoing political demonstrations by retirees. Multiple cities saw protests, including Tehran, Tabriz, Mashhad, Isfahan, Rasht, Yazd, Bojnurd, Khorramabad, Ilam, Ahvaz and Arak. The protests on 13 December, 20 December, 27 December and 3 January were peaceful and non-violent. Fars, Kurdistan, Alborz, Qazvin, Razavi Khorasan, East Azerbaijan, Hamadan, Lorestan, Isfahan, Kermanshah, and Khuzestan provinces also saw protests and demonstrations by retirees. They also held protests in Neyshabur, Haft-Tappeh, Qom, Shush Danial and Arak over economic conditions and ruined livelihoods. Pensioners, medical staff, employees, workers, and firefighters held protests for weeks in December and January complaining about overdue wages.

January 2021 
Iranians continued their protests and angry demonstrations on 26 January amid repression from the security forces. The protest movement was launched on 3 January, when hundreds of sectors took to the streets for the biggest second wave of protests since September, the first in 2021. Retirees and pensioners demonstrated on 26 January in protest at inadequate pensions and worsening conditions and demanded officials return their savings and pensions. Cities like Ahvaz, Shush, Karaj, Tabriz expressed their anger, dissatisfaction with unemployment, social problems and inequality among working citizens and in these cities, retirees protested officials' failure to pay their inherent rights. In Kermanshah, pensioners protesting low salaries and pensions staged rallies in front of government buildings, the third retiree gathering in the city, while in Ilam, protesters organised their third week of demonstrations and gatherings calling for higher salaries and improvements of poor living conditions. In Qazvin, Sari, Mashhad, Khorramshahr, Khorramabad, Bojnurd, Shiraz, Rasht and Sanandaj, mass street protests occurred as well, rallying against plundering policies, calling for officials respect their basic rights, officials' indifference toward their dilemmas and dire living conditions, officials' failure to pay pensioners' rights, regime's indifference, Retirees' salaries do not fit with their expenditures, government did not balance their salaries and many more depriving issues. The precedented wave of fruitful mass street protests and opposition-led growing popular striking demonstrations occurred in larger numbers this week than the last four weeks. This straw of protests has sparked fears among newspapers and controversy among the media, who have warned the explosive and impatient people of Iran might rise up against president Hassan Rouhani.

February 2021 

On 15 February, widespread unrest and severe nonviolent protests and social movement intensified throughout the country.

In Baluchistan, the 2021 Sistan and Baluchestan protests broke out, leaving as many as 10 killed. Rallies, street demonstrations and protest marches has risen since 3 February 2021, when hundreds protested in Isfahan against polluted water. In Shiraz, pensioners rallied for weeks, protesting for larger pensions and calling for new wage increases. The uprising in the Sistan And Baluchistan region has left 50 killed and wounded. Protesters rallied again over the recent days, protesting in Mashhad against retirees conditions and working life for mall employees, and simultaneously, retiree-protesters rallied for their sixth consecutive week in protest against pension law system and social security.

Rallies were held in Tehran, Izeh and Saveh by unemployed workers, workers, farmers over water conditions, low wages and no payment-received, and more deep issues.  Hundreds have taken to the streets daily in Tehran in front of shopping malls and teachers held strikes and sit-ins publicly in-front of preschools, protesting overdue complaints and not receiving their rights in work. Up to 1,000–5,000 participated in protests since the January protests.

Protesters took to the streets of Tehran, Mashhad, Tabriz, Karaj and Ahvaz to express their anger over economic woes and worsening tensions in the country, in protest against the economy. It is the 4th straight week of pensioner protests against low pensioners wages and calling for higher pensions, while retirees have been protesting social security. Protests called for the government to take action and set higher wages for pensioners and retirees, demonstrating for months. The participants of the January–February strike wave was mainly municipality workers, pensioners, retirees, teachers, unemployed or fired workers, railroad workers, petrochemical workers, gas workers, factory workers, miners and manufacturers in Urmia, Mahshahr, Arak, Kerman and more. Teachers, defrauded creditors, other sectors and farmers conducted gatherings in Tehran, Mashhad, Zahedan and Isfahan as well, protesting unpaid wages and demands for their wages grew louder.

Nationwide protests by workers, factory employees and farmers against the plan for higher prices ahead of Nowruz and non-payments. The farmers from Hashtbandi in Hormozgan province went on strike as well as Isfahan, Nurabad and other areas across the country to protest the prices of their products and no wage payments. College students, preschool educators, impoverished citizens, paint workers, bakery workers, and railroad workers of the maintenance sector took to the streets during the string of mass protests, protesting poor conditions and living standards in Iran. Thousands of workers, shopkeepers, steel retirees, drivers, farmers, security staff, residents, water and sewage staff, and bakers rallied in Iran for weeks during the two-week long strike campaign in February in support of the protesting farmers and calling for president Hassan Rouhani to resign.

March 2021 
In Tehran, three protesters were arrested for protesting in the peaceful meetings and nonviolent gatherings, triggering nationwide pensioner protests and widespread demonstrations in Karaj, Arak, Khorramabad, Ahvaz, Isfahan and Shiraz.

On 22 February, retirees staged mass protests across Tehran, Karaj, Tabriz, Isfahan, Shiraz, Ahvaz as part of the weekly retirees strikes and pensioner protests over inflation and economic hardships. Since 3 January, mass protests have rocked nationwide and cities have been gripped with dissent and overflowing demonstrations over inflation and unemployment. Mashhad, Isfahan, Arak, Qazvin, Khorramabad was seen to have experienced protest rallies and street marches in dissatisfaction over adjusting to harsh pensions and poor living conditions for workers.

On 14–17 March, protests by retirees and other sectors across Iran, Urmia and other areas, which was gripped with dissent weekly by pensioners and retirees, was held in protest at rising inflation, demanding their pensions adjusted with the rising inflation rate and the skyrocketing prices. They also protested their long-delayed pensions. Protesters and large crowds gathered nationwide despite police presence calling, chanting and clapping angry slogans calling for the government to adjust their pensions and calling for the government or Hassan Rouhani to resign on the eve of Nowruz. The ongoing protests and anti-establishment demonstrations are worrying for the government ahead of the 2021 Iranian presidential election.

Traditional dairy farmers protested the lack of support on their farming industry from the irrelevant authorities, employees in electricity distribution centres in Tehran demanding their rights, workers in municipalities and buildings in Behbahan staged rallies demanding their wages and protesting poor living conditions, sit-ins by these worker staging rallies was held immediately as well across the country, oil industry retirees in Ahvaz demonstrated calling for better support from the authorities and demanding their worker rights chanting, "We will not relent until we get our rights back.", the protest marches and popular demonstrations, frequent and fruitful mass rallies by workers in the major Fars metal companies continued for their 5th week over the non-fulfillment of the employer's obligations.

In Northeastern Iran, hundreds of protesters clashed with security forces and thousands took part in demonstrations over two days protesting the rape of an eight-year old and seven-year-old girl. Protesters broke cars and shouted slogans, at police chasing and fleeing rock throwing protesters in Gonbad Kavuz.

On 29 March, protests erupted across Iran as protesters take to the streets in Many cities like Tehran, Isfahan, Karaj, and Gilan to protest a trade cooperation act with China for 25 years. Tehran, Kazeroun, Kermanshah, Karaj has seen daily protest gatherings over a new pact with China, heavy security forces presence was reported. Protesters also held rallies in front of governorships in the Alborz and Isfahan provinces to voice "outrage" over the "controversial" pact.

April 2021 
On 4 April, pensioners and retirees held rallies across the country, protesting their poor economic conditions and pension reform to the system, making it harder to adjust to. The protesters held rallies and non-violent marches in Tehran, Arak, Ardabil, Isfahan, Ahvaz, Ilam, Khorramabad, Rasht, Sari, Sanandaj, Shiraz, Karaj, Kerman, Kermanshah, Gorgan, Qazvin, Mashhad, Yazd, Neyshabur, Shush, Shooshtar, and Abhar. Demonstrations erupted nationwide after security forces intimidated demonstrators particularly in strikes and marches.

On 14 April, retirees and pensioners held nationwide protests and demonstrations calling for the boycott of the upcoming sham presidential elections over the insufficient pensions they have received. The gatherings took place in Tehran, Karaj, Khorramabad, Arak, Mashhad, Neyshabur, Kerman, Yazd, Qazvin, Kermanshah, Tabriz, Ahvaz, Bojnurd, Rasht, Behshahr, Shush, Shushtar, Boroujerd, Isfahan, Maku, and Shahroud.

On 25 April, water system workers launched sit-ins and protests alongside the Zayanderud river, the largest river of the Iranian Plateau, to protest the deaths of thousands of fish every year.

See also 
 Iran student protests, July 1999
 2009 Iranian presidential election protests
 2016 Cyrus the Great Revolt
 2017–2018 Iranian protests
 2017–2019 Iranian protests against compulsory hijab
 2018–2019 Iranian general strikes and protests
 2018 Dervish protests
 2018 Khuzestan protests
 2018 Iranian water protests
 2019–2020 Iranian protests
 2021–2022 Sistan and Baluchestan protests
 2021–2022 Iranian protests
 2022 Mahsa Amini protests

References

2020 protests
2021 protests
Iranian democracy movements
Protests in Iran
Protests over responses to the COVID-19 pandemic